Marinella Panayiotou (born 4 October 1995) is a Cypriot footballer who plays as a forward for Beroe and the Cyprus women's national team.

Club career
On 23 August 2016, Panayiotou joined Barcelona FA. Two years later, she moved to AC Omonia.

International career
Panayiotou capped for Cyprus at senior level during the 2017 Aphrodite Cup, including a 1–2 loss to Latvia on 12 March 2017.

References

1995 births
Living people
Women's association football forwards
Cypriot women's footballers
Cyprus women's international footballers
AC Omonia players
Barcelona FA players